Ceratomia catalpae, the catalpa sphinx, is a hawk moth of the family Sphingidae. The species was first described by Jean Baptiste Boisduval in 1875.

Range
Ceratomia catalpae is a native of southeastern North America and can be located on catalpa trees that grow within this region. It can be found from Maine, west to Iowa, south to Florida, the Gulf States and Texas.

Life cycle
From oviposition of the eggs to pupation, about four weeks will pass. Where multiple broods occur, pupae will eclose in two weeks, or when conditions are suitable. Adult C. catalpae do not reflect the wonderful colors of their larvae. They are a dull brown color lacking the show-off appearance of its larval stages.

Egg
Translucent, milky-white, green, or yellowish eggs are oval, being about 0.5 mm in diameter. Eggs are deposited in masses of 100-1000 eggs on the undersurface of leaves, while smaller masses are deposited onto branches on the catalpa tree. Eggs incubate and hatch five to seven days after oviposition.

Larva
The larval stage of C. catalpae is known as the catalpa or catawba worm. When first hatching, the larvae are very pale, but become darker toward the last instars. The yellow caterpillars will usually have a dark, black stripe down their back along with black dots along their sides. There is also a "pale" phase where the black striping is not as prevalent or missing altogether and a shade of white has replaced it. They are highly desired by fishermen as bait.

Pupa
Like most other Sphingidae, Ceratomia catalpae will burrow into the ground after its fifth and final instar in order to pupate. The larvae will go into a "wandering" stage where it leaves the catalpa tree and climbs to the ground to find a place to bury itself so that it may pupate. The larvae will then shed its fifth instar skin to reveal its pupal skin, which will be soft and almost translucent at first, but will then harden to a light brown for protection from the elements.

Adult
The adult catalpa sphinx is brown with a circular band of dark brown or black surrounding its thorax. Each forewing has a small, dark mark towards the middle, with a white dot in the cell. The body is approximately 30 mm long. The wingspan is 65–95 mm.

Images of life cycle

Food plants
C. catalpae can be quite harmful to the catalpa tree during large outbreaks. The first trial of aerial crop dusting was an attempt to control the catalpa sphinx. However, more recent research may indicate the caterpillars are not as harmful as once thought. The research of Stephen L. Peele, curator of the Florida Mycology Research Center, indicates that catalpa trees might be completely defoliated multiple times during a single summer yet still survive and return to full health, a process which, Peele says, no other tree could survive. "They always come back. They always look healthy," says Peele. "I have tried to understand the possible symbiotic relationship between the worm and the tree. There surely must be one."
Catalpa bignonioides, (southern catalpa)
Catalpa speciosa, (northern catalpa)

Human use
C. catalpae caterpillars are used as fishing baits to catch bass, bream, and catfish.

References

External links
Catalpa sphinx, Moths of North America
Ceratomia catalpae, Sphingidae of the Americas

Ceratomia
Moths described in 1875
Moths of North America